Class or The Class may refer to:

Common uses not otherwise categorized
 Class (biology), a taxonomic rank
 Class (knowledge representation), a collection of individuals or objects
 Class (philosophy), an analytical concept used differently from such group phenomena as "types" or "kinds"
 Class (set theory), a collection of sets that can be unambiguously defined by a property that all its members share
 Hazard class, a dangerous goods classification
 Social class, the hierarchical arrangement of individuals in society, usually defined by wealth and occupation
 Working class, can be defined by rank, income or collar

Arts, entertainment, and media
"The Class" (song), 1959 Chubby Checker song
Character class in role-playing games and other genres
Class 95 (radio station), a Singaporean radio channel

Films
Class (film), 1983 American film
The Class (2007 film), 2007 Estonian film
The Class (2008 film), 2008 film (Entre les murs)

Television
Class (2010 TV series), a 2010 British television programme, broadcast on CBBC
Class (2016 TV series), a 2016 British spinoff from Doctor Who
The Class (TV series), a CBS sitcom
Class (2023 TV series), a 2023 Indian Netflix teen drama

Literature
Class: A Guide Through the American Status System by Paul Fussell
Class (Pacifico novel), a 2014 novel by Francesco Pacifico
Class (Rosenfeld novel), a 2017 novel by Lucinda Rosenfeld
The Class (Segal novel), a 1985 novel by Erich Segal

Computing 
Class (computer programming), a fundamental concept of object-oriented programming
Class (warez), a defunct group in the warez scene
C++ classes, program-specific data types 
Class attribute (HTML), a feature of many HTML and XHTML elements
Class attributes (computer programming), defining the structure of a class
Complexity class, a set of problems of related complexity in computational complexity theory
Java class file, the interpretable bytecode of a compiled Java program
Pseudo-class, in cascading style sheets
Type class, a type system construct that supports polymorphism

Education
 Class (education), a group of students attending a specific course or lesson
 Class, a course (education)
 Class, a lesson or course session, in education
 Classroom, a room where classes are held

Law and government
 Class, a group of people involved in a class action lawsuit
 Classes of United States senators, for describing the schedules of elections for Senate seats

Transportation
Class (locomotive), a single design of a locomotive as assigned by the railroad
Class rating, an allowance to fly aircraft of similar design
Classification of United States railroads:
Class I railroad
Class II railroad
Class III railroad
Ship class, a group of ships of similar design
Travel class, a quality of accommodation on public transport
Vehicle size class, a way of classifying cars

See also
 CLASS (disambiguation)
 Klass (disambiguation)